Akamai may refer to:
 Akamai Technologies, a company that develops software for web content and application delivery
 Akamai Foundation, a sponsor of the American Mathematics Competitions, founded by Akamai Technologies
Akamai Techs., Inc. v. Limelight Networks, Inc., a patent case involving when patent infringement may be found when a patented method is performed by a group of persons
 Akamai University, an educational institution in Hawaii